General elections were held in South Africa on 30 March 1966. The result was another comprehensive victory for the National Party under Hendrik Frensch Verwoerd.

The election marked a major strengthening of power for the ruling NP, which gained a two-thirds majority in parliament for the first time. The main opposition United Party slightly increased its share of the popular vote, but nevertheless saw its parliamentary representation considerably reduced.

The number of House of Assembly seats for White voters in South Africa had been increased from 150 to 160 by the Constitution Amendment Act of 1965. In addition, there were six seats for White voters from South-West Africa (now Namibia). There were also four seats reserved for Coloured representatives, who did not have to stand for re-election during 1966.

On 6 September, several months after the election, Prime Minister Verwoerd was assassinated.

Coloured Representative Members
The second election for the four coloured representative members had taken place on 4 October 1961, before the (white voters only) general election on 8 October 1961. Under the Separate Representation of Voters Act 1951, the members had been elected to serve until the dissolution of the 1961–1966 Parliament.

The Progressive Party (PP) won the two seats representing coloured voters on the Cape Provincial Council, at an election in 1965. The National Party (NP) government became concerned at the prospect of four additional Progressive MPs being elected. The opposition United Party (UP) also feared the loss of support, if the existing four UP supported independent members were defeated.

Parliament passed the Separate Representation of Voters Amendment Act 1965. This legislation extended the term of the existing coloured representatives until October 1966. Further Separate Representation of Voters Amendment Acts, in 1966 and 1968, extended the term until the dissolution of what turned out to be the 1966–1970 Parliament. The coloured representation in Parliament would then be abolished.

Delimitation of electoral divisions
The South Africa Act 1909 had provided for a delimitation commission to define the boundaries for each electoral division, for general roll voters in the four provinces. The republican constitution continued the arrangements for a commission. The representation by province, under the twelfth delimitation report of 1965, is set out in the table below. The figures in brackets are the number of electoral divisions in the previous (1958) delimitation. If there is no figure in brackets then the number was unchanged.

South-West Africa (with six seats) and the coloured representatives (4 seats), were unaffected by the general delimitation provisions.

Composition at the dissolution
The 13th Parliament since the Union of 1910 and the 1st elected after the republic was proclaimed in 1961, was dissolved in 1966. At the time the House of Assembly consisted of two groups of members. White voters were represented by 156 general roll members and coloured voters in Cape Province by four white MPs known at the time as Coloured Representative Members (CRM).

The general election only affected the representatives of white voters. The other members were elected on a different date (see above).

Since the previous election, the United Party had absorbed the National Union, with which it had had an electoral alliance in 1961.

The representation by party and province, at the dissolution was:-

Results
A total of 356 candidates were nominated; 154 for the National Party, 141 for the United Party, 26 for the Progressive Party, 22 for the Republican Party, 10 for the Front Party, two independents and one Christian National Party. The Republican, Front and Conservative National groups were new right-wing parties, which had not contested previous general elections.

Eighteen candidates were returned unopposed, seventeen representing the National Party and one the United Party. The Progressive Party barely kept its Houghton seat, held by Helen Suzman since her defection from the UP, winning by 117 votes.

By province

References

General elections in South Africa
South Africa
General
Events associated with apartheid
March 1966 events in Africa